The 1985 Nordic Figure Skating Championships were held from February 14 through 17, 1985 in Copenhagen, Denmark. The competition was open to elite figure skaters from Nordic countries. Skaters competed in two disciplines, men's singles and ladies' singles across two levels: senior (Olympic-level) and junior.

Senior results

Men

Ladies

Junior results

Men

Ladies

References

Nordic Figure Skating Championships, 1985
Nordic Figure Skating Championships, 1985
Nordic Figure Skating Championships
International figure skating competitions hosted by Denmark
International sports competitions in Copenhagen